The Chrysler 200 is a mid-size sedan that was manufactured and marketed by Chrysler from model years 2011 to 2017 across two generations in four-door sedan and two-door convertible (first generation only) body styles.

The 200 nameplate debuted on the 200C, a prototype hybrid vehicle shown at the 2009 North American International Auto Show in Detroit and based on the Chrysler 300. The 200C concept was engineered to accept either traditional gasoline, hybrid or full-electric powertrains.

First generation (2011)

The first generation Chrysler 200 was a restyled, rebadged and re-engineered version of the third generation Chrysler Sebring that began production in 2006. Although the JS platform, of Mitsubishi origins, had been retained, there were many cosmetic and powertrain changes to the 200.

The 2.4 L four-cylinder   engine with either a four-speed or six-speed automatic transmission carried over. A flex-fuel version of the 3.6 L Pentastar engine was also available. Other changes included stiffer body mounts, revised suspension geometry with a softer ride rate, a new rear sway bar, and upgraded tires. The 200 was also more highly equipped than the Sebring. Chrysler added features such as LED lighting, thicker seat cushioning with higher quality materials, along with new measures to decrease noise, vibration, and harshness.

The Chrysler 200 was manufactured at Sterling Heights Assembly (Sterling Heights, Michigan) and arrived at dealers in December 2010. A 2-door convertible model was added in early 2011 with the same engine choices.

The 200 and its platform mate, the Dodge Avenger, were ranked the "Most American Made" sedans and convertibles by The Kogod Made in America Auto Index in 2013.

According to Edmunds' Acevedot, "by changing the name, Chrysler was able to let its midsize offering ride the coattails of the Chrysler 300 and to encourage consumers to think of the 200 as the younger brother of the flagship 300"; as an all-new generation of the 300 was released at the same time. Acevedot also noted that the name change has the added benefit of distancing itself from its predecessor, a vehicle notorious for quality issues and fleet pervasiveness.

In early 2013, Chrysler CEO Sergio Marchionne announced that the first generation model will be short lived and a redesigned next generation model would appear in auto shows January 2014.

Changes

2013

The 2013 Chrysler 200 Convertible featured revised suspensions. Prior to the 2013 model year, the suspension on convertibles was largely shared with the Sebring that preceded it. The softtop convertible now matches the sedan's revised suspension. The retractable-hardtop could not fully accommodate the changes because the stiffer suspension would have made the ride too harsh. The retractable-hardtop version was also updated to the steering rack and rear toe link that the softtop received.

In 2013 the S trim was removed and became two appearance options, S Interior and S Exterior options - that could be added to other 200 models. The two exceptions to this was the 200 S Special Edition and 200 Super S.

Mid-year in the 2013 model year, Chrysler unveiled the 2013.5 Chrysler 200 S Special Edition, made in conjunction with Carhartt. It was offered in sedan form only, and had a suggested retail price of $28,870. The car featured unique Mopar parts and suspension that were not offered previously, which lowered the car and stiffened the suspension. It also featured custom Carhartt embroidery atop the most premium interior options for the 200.

The 200 S Special Edition evolved into the 200 Super S the following year, with additional performance improvements.

2014
The limited edition 2014 Chrysler 200 Super S was a Mopar modified version and included two stages. Stage One enhancements include a chin spoiler, mesh upper and lower grilles with the upper grille finished in gloss black, as well as satin chrome grille and fog light trim. Side sills are included with gray or hyper black 18-inch wheels, while black chrome badges and satin chrome side molding differentiate the Super S. Additional satin chrome finishes include the rear light bar, as well as a new trunk lid spoiler and a matte black diffuser.

Stage Two enhancements are mechanical. A cold-air intake is fitted under the hood while a cat-back exhaust replaces the stock setup. A coil-over suspension provides a lowered ride height and a lower center of gravity.

Lancia Flavia

In Europe between 2012 and 2014, the 200 Convertible was rebranded and marketed under the Italian Lancia marque. 
 Both convertible and sedan versions were displayed at the 2011 Geneva Motor Show as concepts, but only the convertible saw production. The Lancia Flavia was only available in left-hand drive markets, and thus not sold in the United Kingdom or Ireland.

Chrysler discontinued production in 2014.

Engines

Safety

Second generation (2015) 

The 2015 model year Chrysler 200 debuted on January 13, 2014 at the 2014 North American International Auto Show in Detroit, Michigan. Based on the Fiat Compact platform, FCA (Fiat Chrysler Automobiles) used the long wheelbase version dubbed CUSW (Compact US Wide) for the second generation Chrysler 200. It is offered in four trim levels, LX, Limited, S as well as C — and is positioned as a mid-size entry intended to compete with Toyota Camry, Nissan Altima, Honda Accord, Mazda6, Volkswagen Passat, Chevrolet Malibu, and Ford Fusion.

Becoming available in mid-2014 as an early 2015 Model Year vehicle, the second generation debuted at the 2014 North American International Auto Show in Detroit, Michigan, and became available in dealership showrooms shortly after.

The second-generation 200 also had the best V6 horsepower the lowest drag-coefficient (0.27), and was the first car in its segment to have a dial-based gear shift. 

The second generation is only offered in sedan form. Chrysler noted the declining demand for convertibles, and high costs to create a convertible version using the all-new platforms, as reasons for not offering a convertible version.

Models
At its launch, the 200 was available in base LX, Limited, sporty 200S, and top-of-the-range 200C trim levels. Midway through the 2016 model year, new Touring, Limited Platinum, and 200C Platinum trims were added in place of the previous Limited and 200C.

Production
The 200 continued in production at Sterling Heights Assembly with the plant's paint shop received upgrades to facilitate production. 2015 Chrysler 200 production assembly began in May 2014, a month prior to going on sale. The vehicle had a base price of $21,700 excluding a $995 destination charge.

An all wheel drive system is available with the 3.6 L engine, including a fully disconnecting rear drive axle to improve fuel efficiency. The system detects adverse road conditions and engages, sending power to all 4 wheels. The system disengages when increased traction is no longer needed. The 200 would also offer a stop/start system to aid fuel efficiency with the 2.4 L TigerShark engine.

Production of the Chrysler 200 ended on December 2, 2016 at Sterling Heights Assembly. Chrysler restructured the 200's final model lineup to add new models and packages with fewer options for 2017. The new models debuted midyear 2016 as 2016.5 models. The new models included Touring, Limited Platinum, 200S Alloy Edition, and 200C Platinum, which replaced the Limited (Touring) and 200C (200C Platinum) models respectively. The 2017 model year production run was exactly four months, with enough dealer supply to last through midyear 2017.

Infotainment features 

The all-new 2015 Chrysler 200 offered four different Uconnect infotainment systems:

 The base 200 LX trim featured the Uconnect 3.0 (RA1) radio. This was a basic A/M-F/M only radio with USB and auxiliary audio inputs with a three-inch monochrome non-touchscreen LCD display screen. This radio featured a four-speaker audio system.
 All 200 trims aside from the base LX trim featured the Uconnect 3 5.0BT (RA2) touchscreen radio. This system featured an A/M-F/M radio, Uconnect Bluetooth hands-free calling and wireless streaming stereo audio via A2DP, with USB and auxiliary audio inputs with a five-inch color LCD touchscreen display. Standard on 200S and 200C trims, and available on the Limited trim was SiriusXM Satellite Radio with a one-year trial subscription. All audio and Bluetooth telephone features of the system could be controlled via the integrated voice controls. The system was also available on the base LX trim level. This system also featured a six-speaker audio system. A rearview backup camera system was standard on most models equipped with this radio, and available on lower trim levels.
 Available on all 200 trims aside from the base LX trim was the Uconnect 3C 8.4A (RA3) touchscreen infotainment system. In addition to the features available on other radios, this system also integrated a 3G CDMA modem with service provided by Sprint and a six-month trial subscription to Uconnect Access, as well as an 8.4-inch full-color LCD touchscreen display, and voice control for most vehicle features, including audio, climate, and Bluetooth telephone. GPS navigation, provided by Garmin, could be added onto this system by the dealership for an additional fee, although 3D mapping capabilities and SiriusXM Travel Link service were not included as part of the package. A rearview backup camera system was standard on models equipped with this system, and a six-speaker audio system was standard equipment (as was SiriusXM Satellite Radio with a one-year complimentary trial subscription), with a nine-speaker, 506-watt Alpine premium amplified surround-sound audio system available as an option on the 200S and 200C trims.
 Available only on the up-level 200S and 200C trims was the Uconnect 3C 8.4AN (RA4) touchscreen infotainment system. Virtually identical to the Uconnect 3C 8.4A (RA3) system, this system also included an integrated the GPS navigation system provided by Garmin, with a one-year trial subscription to Uconnect Access, as well as a five-year trial subscription to SiriusXM Travel Link service, and a one-year trial subscription to SiriusXM Satellite Radio. The Garmin GPS navigation software also featured 3D mapping capabilities. A rearview backup camera system was included on models equipped with this system, and a nine-speaker, Alpine premium amplified surround-sound audio system was also included with this system. This was also the only system to offer built-in HD Radio capabilities.

Equipment 
Most equipment listed below is either optional, or only included on some models
SafetyTec System (Only available optionally on 200C)
Full speed-range adaptive cruise control with Stop and Go
Full-speed forward collision warning (FCW) with active braking
Lane departure warning with lane keep assist
Blind spot monitoring system
 Also included on the optional SafetyTec system for the 200C, but available as an option on other models
Rear backup camera
Electric park brake with Safehold 
Parallel and perpendicular Park assist
Uconnect systems: Bluetooth streaming audio, Uconnect voice command and Bluetooth (with Uconnect access). The 8.4AN System adds navigation, featuring full-color 3-D graphics and HD Radio.
7-inch customizable driver information display (DID) electronic instrument cluster
Standard nine-speed automatic transmission with Rotary E-shift
Keyless Enter 'n Go

Technology features include a 7-inch LED screen full color instrument cluster, standard electronic rotary dial replacing the console shifter, push button start, an available 8.4-inch Uconnect touch screen and a hands off the steering wheel automated parking system. An open pass through center console provides storage. An Alpine 9-speaker and subwoofer system as well as a dual panoramic sunroof are available options on 200S and 200C trims while Limited trims are available with a traditional single panel sunroof.

Safety

Discontinuation 
After its first year in production, Fiat Chrysler Automobiles CEO Sergio Marchionne said the Chrysler 200 would "run its course" under the current Compact US Wide architecture, pointing to the car being discontinued. While in his initial announcement of this news, he criticized the car's rear-door entry - some have argued this may not be due to the car's quality or success - particularly as the second-generation Chrysler 200 has been a high volume seller for FCA.

According to CEO Marchionne: “The 200 failed because somebody thought that the rear-seat entry point inside the 200 — which is our fault, by the way — is not up to snuff. The problem: The slope of the roof crimps the entry portal. The Hyundai which we copied [presumably the Sonata] has the same problem. We didn’t copy the car, we copied the entry point to the rear seat. Dummies. I acknowledge it. Some people from design left some of their private parts on the table after we came up with that determination. But I think we’re learning from this process.”

Instead, more evidence points to FCA's stronger sales in trucks and SUVs being a primary reason for discontinuation. FCA also discontinued the Dodge Dart, FCA's other CUSW car - while maintaining production of the Jeep Cherokee SUV, and Chrysler Pacifica minivan, which are mechanically similar to the Chrysler 200, share a platform and many parts.

Marchionne had said that he would be willing to continue production of the Chrysler 200, if another automaker continued it - though he did not specify if he was seeking another manufacturer to produce the 200 as-is, or as a captive import of another vehicle. Either solution would not impact FCA's CAFE margins, thus allowing it to continue selling the cars while existing as primarily a truck manufacturer in the United States.

On July 26, 2016, FCA announced that Chrysler 200 production at the Sterling Heights plant would end in December 2016. After a short run as a 2017 model, production of the Chrysler 200 ended on December 2, 2016.

At the 2017 Detroit Auto Show, Marchionne explained the decision to end production, and not offer a replacement for the US or Canada: "I can tell you right now that both the Chrysler 200 and the Dodge Dart, as great products as they were, were the least financially rewarding enterprises that we've carried out inside FCA in the last eight years," adding "I don't know one investment that was as bad as these two were."

This strategy positions FCA in the US as largely a manufacturer of SUVs and trucks. The company had to find additional capacity for Jeep and Ram. FCA plans to move production of its Ram pickup to Sterling Heights.

Marketing and sales

Marketing
For Super Bowl XLV, Chrysler purchased a 2-minute-long advertisement featuring Eminem with the motto Imported from Detroit. Chrysler was thinking about using the Chrysler 300 in the advertisement, since it had a higher retail price than the 200 and also enjoyed better press-reviews, but quickly rejected the idea since the 300 is not manufactured in the United States, but in Ontario, Canada and would not fit the company's new branding. This commercial enjoyed great popularity among viewers, with the term "Chrysler 200" being the second most-searched term on Google the day after the Super Bowl and search traffic for the vehicle going up by 685 percent on AOL Autos. Shortly after being uploaded to YouTube after the Super Bowl, the ad quickly received over 5 million views.

The Chrysler 200 also featured heavily in the London-based 24: Live Another Day spinoff series of 24. This is despite the fact that the vehicle was never sold in the UK. A legally required front numberplate is not present, the rear numberplate details are for a Ford Mondeo.

Sales

Notes

References

External links

Official website

200
2010s cars
Compact executive cars
Mid-size cars
Sedans
Convertibles
Front-wheel-drive vehicles
Cars introduced in 2010
Hardtop convertibles